Memory Almost Full is the fourteenth solo studio album by English musician Paul McCartney. It was released in the United Kingdom on 4 June 2007 and in the United States a day later. The album was the first release on Starbucks' Hear Music label. It was produced by David Kahne and recorded at Abbey Road Studios, Henson Recording Studios, AIR Studios, Hog Hill Mill Studios and RAK Studios between October 2003, and from 2006 to February 2007. In between the 2003 and 2006 sessions, McCartney was working on another studio album, Chaos and Creation in the Backyard (2005), with producer Nigel Godrich.

Memory Almost Full reached the Top 5 in both the UK and US, as well as Denmark, Sweden, Greece, and Norway. The Grammy-nominated album has sold over 2 million copies worldwide and has been certified gold by the RIAA for shipments of over 500,000 copies just in the United States. The album was released in three versions: a single disc, a 2-CD set, and a CD/DVD deluxe edition, the latter of which was released on 6 November 2007.

Background
Nine demos were recorded at The Mill studio in September 2003 by Paul McCartney and his touring band. A month later, in October, album sessions for Memory Almost Full began, and were produced by David Kahne and recorded at Abbey Road Studios. McCartney and the band recorded the songs "You Tell Me", "Only Mama Knows", "Vintage Clothes", "That Was Me", "Feet in the Clouds", "House of Wax", "The End of the End", and "Whole Life". However, the sessions were cut short and put on hiatus when McCartney started another album, Chaos and Creation in the Backyard, with producer Nigel Godrich.

In the website constructed for the album, McCartney stated: "I actually started this album, Memory Almost Full, before my last album Chaos and Creation in the Backyard, released September 2005. (...) When I was just finishing up everything concerned with Chaos and had just got the Grammy nominations (2006) I realised I had this album to go back to and finish off. So I got it out to listen to it again, wondering if I would enjoy it, but actually I really loved it. All I did at first was just listen to a couple of things and then I began to think, 'OK, I like that track – now, what is wrong with it?' And it might be something like a drum sound, so then I would re-drum and see where we would get to. (...) In places it's a very personal record and a lot of it is retrospective, drawing from memory, like memories from being a kid, from Liverpool and from summers gone. The album is evocative, emotional, rocking, but I can't really sum it up in one sentence".

Recording
Many songs from Memory Almost Full were from a group of songs, which also included songs from Chaos and Creation in the Backyard, and some intended for the former nearly ended up on the latter. Any songs that were started, but not finished, for Chaos and Creation in the Backyard, McCartney didn't want to re-do for Memory Almost Full. As sessions for the album progressed McCartney wrote some more songs, something that McCartney used to do when he was in the Beatles. An early version of "Ever Present Past" was recorded at either one of the three following studios: RAK Studios, AIR Studios or Ocean Way Studios; sometime between November 2003 and April 2005. Two years after the 2003 session, sessions for the album started again. The book Paul McCartney: Recording Sessions (1969-2013). A Journey Through Paul McCartney's Songs After The Beatles reports that the recordings of the album were started in September–October 2003 and resumed in February 2004 at Abbey Road, with other sessions taking place between March 2006 and February 2007.

New tracks were recorded at the following studios: McCartney's home studio in Sussex, The Mill, Los Angeles' Henson Studios, London's RAK Studios and AIR Studios, and New York's SeeSquared Studios. The songs recorded at those studios were "Nod Your Head", "In Private", "222", "Gratitude", "Mr Bellamy", "See Your Sunshine", and "Ever Present Past". Of those songs, "Mr Bellamy", "Ever Present Past", "Gratitude", "Nod Your Head", and "In Private" were all recorded on the same day, in March 2006. As well as working on songs from the first Memory Almost Full album session in 2003, "Why So Blue" was re-recorded. In total, between 20 and 25 songs were recorded for the album. "Dance Tonight" was recorded, along with "Feet in the Clouds" and "222" being reworked, between January and February 2007 at RAK Studios, as the last song recorded for the album. The album was mixed by Kahne and Andy Wallace.

Songs
In an interview with Billboard magazine in May 2007, McCartney said that the album's material was "in some ways a little bit retrospective. Some of them are of now, some of them hark back to the past, but all of them are songs I'm very proud of." McCartney played mandolin on the song "Dance Tonight". He comments that "In searching the instrument to try and find chords, which I did with the guitar when I was 14, probably, that freshness was brought back." "Ever Present Past", which McCartney called "personal", originally started out as a song called "Perfect Lover". This early version was more folk-like, similar to Chaos and Creation in the Backyards "Friends to Go". "Perfect Lover" went through a minor lyrical change, the bridge was changed, and an overhaul of its musical arrangement, before it finally became "Ever Present Past". The track also includes references to the Beatles. In June 2007, McCartney revealed that "See Your Sunshine" "is pretty much an out-and-out love song for Heather. A lot of the album was done before, during and after our separation. I didn't go back and take out any songs to do with her." "You Tell Me" is about McCartney's memories of his previous wife, Linda.

"Mr Bellamy", the sixth song on the album, was thought by online fans to be about McCartney's then-recent divorce. McCartney invited Radiohead frontman Thom Yorke to play piano on the song, but he declined. The press ran articles claiming that Yorke had "snubbed" McCartney, but Yorke later revealed that he "really liked the song" but felt he would be unable to perform to the required standard. "Gratitude" is reportedly about the divorce between Heather Mills and McCartney.

The album features a five song-medley, which in an interview with Billboard magazine, McCartney said that it was previously "something I wanted to revisit" as "nobody had been doing that for a while." The medley was a set of intentionally written material, whereas the medley that McCartney had worked on on the Beatles' Abbey Road was actually made up of "bits we had knocking around." The medley starts off with "Vintage Clothes", which McCartney "sat down one day" to write, that was "looking back, [and] looking back.", about life. It was followed by the bass-led "That Was Me", which is about his "school days and teachers", the medley, as McCartney stated, then "progressed from there." The next songs are "Feet in the Clouds", about the inactivity while one is growing up, and "House of Wax", about the life of being a celebrity. The final song in medley, "The End of the End", was written at McCartney's Cavendish Avenue home while playing on his father, Jim's, piano.

Album title, and CD casing
Some people mentioned that the album's title, Memory Almost Full, is an anagram of "for my soulmate LLM" (the initials of Linda Louise McCartney). When asked if this was intentional, McCartney replied; "Some things are best left a mystery". In an interview with Pitchfork Media, McCartney clarified, "I must say, someone told me [there is an anagram], and I think it's a complete mystery, because it's so complete. There does appear to be an anagram in the title. And it's a mystery. It was not intentional." The album's title was actually inspired by a message that came up on his mobile phone. He thought the phrase summed up modern life.

A significant proportion of the CD release of Memory Almost Full incorporated a cover insert whose top-right corner was intentionally folded down to the center of the insert, leaving the CD tray visible. The folded-down white corner covers up the corner of the armchair image, but has the artist and album names printed so that the text is complete despite the fold. Upon opening and flattening out the cover insert, the armchair is complete, but the portion of the text which is printed on the folded-down corner is not printed on the front of the cover, leaving the text incomplete. This was the first time such an artistic intervention occurred within a standard jewel-case, and at first glance had the possibility of being viewed as a mis-manufactured copy. McCartney on the CD case/album artwork: "I really wanted to make the CD a desirable object. Something that I know I'd want to pick up from the shelf, something that would make people curious."

Release and promotion
The album was his first for Starbucks' Hear Music record label, after previously having a 45-year-old relationship with Capitol/EMI. The recording contract with Capitol/EMI ended a few months prior to the release of the album, after McCartney had found out that EMI were planning to take six months to set up a promotional plan for the album. McCartney was the first artist to sign to Hear Music. The Rock Radio website leaked a track listing for the album on 12 April 2007. A day later, producer David Kahne stated on the same site that the leaked listing was bogus. The first US single, "Ever Present Past", made its radio debut on 20 April. A music video for "Dance Tonight" premiered on 23 May via YouTube. The album was released on 4 June 2007 in the UK, and a day later on the 5th in the US, and with a vinyl edition later in the month on 25 June.

It was also McCartney's first album to be available as a digital download. The lead single for the rest of the world is "Dance Tonight", released on McCartney's 65th birthday in the UK, 18 June as a digital download, with a physical release a month later, on 23 July of a CD single and a 10" shaped picture disc. The music video features Natalie Portman and Mackenzie Crook, and was directed by Michel Gondry. The third single, "Nod Your Head", was released as a digital download single on 28 August via the iTunes Store. "Ever Present Past" was released as a single in the UK, on 5 November, as a CD single and 7" single.

Promotion for the album came in several forms, such as a worldwide listening party at over 10,000 Starbucks stores on the day of the album's US release, with an approximation of 6 million people hearing the album. At ten of the Starbucks stores, fans contributed in a video tribute, that aired on the internet on 18 June 2007. Other promotions included a limited edition Paul McCartney Starbucks card, similar to what they had done for Ray Charles's Genius Loves Company, the Starbucks-owned satellite radio station XM Channel made a program about McCartney and the album, released one song prior to the album on iTunes, performed at iTunes Festival: London, and playing free shows. On 6 November 2007, the album was re-released as Memory Almost Full – Deluxe Edition. The set included one CD and one DVD. The CD included the standard album plus the three extra songs from the 2-CD edition. The DVD contained five tracks recorded live at The Electric Ballroom in London, and two music videos.

Reception

Memory Almost Full received positive reaction. At Metacritic, the album earned an average score of 69 based on 23 reviews from critics, which indicates "Generally favorable reviews". Evan Serpick of Rolling Stone magazine also compared the medley of five songs in the second part of the album to the famous song suite in The Beatles' Abbey Road. This album was ranked number 22 on Rolling Stones list of the Top 50 Albums of 2007.

Commercial performance
In the US, Memory Almost Full debuted at number 3 on the Billboard 200 with about 161,000 copies sold within the first week, making it McCartney's highest-charting album there since 1997's Flaming Pie. 47% of the album sales from the opening week were from Starbucks coffee shops, which were the best sales for any album in the history of Starbucks. While it was announced that copies of the album sold in the Starbucks coffee shops in the UK would not be counted by the Official UK Charts, because they are not registered in the copies counting system, Memory Almost Full, however, still managed to hit number 5 on the UK Album Charts. The album also peaked at number 1 on Billboard Internet Sales Chart, and number 3 on Billboard Top Internet Albums Downloads.

It was ranked at number 90 on the top-100 of the Billboard Year-end chart, and number 177 on the UK year-end chart. The album won awards for the Best PR Campaign award at the Music Week Awards ceremony, and the Online/Digital Campaign award by New Media Age. The album reportedly sold 105,000 copies in his homeland before the standard version of the CD in a unique slip-case was given away free as part of a promotion with British newspaper The Mail on Sunday (18 May 2008).

"Ever Present Past" peaked at number 10 in the Bubbling Under Hot 100, and also charting at number 16 on Billboard Adult Contemporary. "Dance Tonight" peaked at number 46 on Billboard Hot Digital Songs, number 58 Billboard Pop 100, and finally at number 69 on Billboard Hot 100.

Track listing
All songs written by Paul McCartney.

Personnel
Personnel per booklet.

Musicians
Paul McCartney – all instruments except for "Only Mama Knows", "You Tell Me", "Vintage Clothes", "That Was Me", "Feet in the Clouds", and "House of Wax", where he was joined by the following musicians (all from his touring band):
Paul Wickens – keyboards
Rusty Anderson – guitar
Brian Ray – bass
Abe Laboriel Jr. – drums

Production
David Kahne – producer and programming
Adam Noble, David Kahne, Steve Orchard, Geoff Emerick, Paul Hicks – engineers
Jamie Kirkham, Eddie Klein, Adam Noble, Chris Bolster, Kevin Mills, Mirek Stiles – assistant engineers
David Kahne,  Andy Wallace – mixing
Bob Ludwig – mastering
Humphrey Ocean – cover art front: black love chair (aquatint) and cover art back: black love chair (gouache)
Max Vadukul – inlay photography
Rebecca and Mike – ideas

Grammy nominations
Memory Almost Full has been nominated in the following categories:
Best Pop Vocal Album for Memory Almost Full (2008)
Best Male Pop Vocal Performance for "Dance Tonight" (2008)
Best Solo Rock Vocal Performance for "Only Mama Knows" (2008)
Best Male Pop Vocal Performance for "That Was Me" (2009)

Charts

Weekly charts

Year-end charts

Certifications and salesNotes:
 On the article that Concord Music Group posted on their official site in February 2007 (a month before Memory Almost Full was certified gold by the Recording Industry Association of America), Hear Music announced that shipments of the album reached a platinum status in the US. The label also claimed that the album gained a gold in other countries like Norway, though International Federation of the Phonographic Industry has not certified the album at any label there as of 2014.

2007 mini-tour releases

In the summer and autumn of 2007, Paul embarked on a promotional mini-tour playing concerts to small audiences, all in support of his album Memory Almost Full. Four of the performances were later released in various formats.

The Electric Ballroom

Five songs from this 7 June 2007 show at the Electric Ballroom in London were released as video tracks on the Memory Almost Full deluxe edition bonus DVD (see Track Listing above).

Amoeba Gig

On 27 June 2007, Paul and his band played unannounced at Amoeba Music in Hollywood, California. The performance was released as follows:
 in 2007, a 4-track EP called Amoeba's Secret
 also in 2007, 4 tracks were released on b-sides of different versions of the single "Ever Present Past" (see table below)
 in 2010, a 12-track UK/Ireland promotional CD called Live in Los Angeles
 in 2012, a 14-track digital release on his website to premium members, called Live in Los Angeles – The Extended Set
 in 2019, the full 21-song performance was finally released as Amoeba GigAmoeba performance track listings'''

iTunes Festival: London

On 5 July 2007, Paul and his band played for 350 fans in the Institute of Contemporary Arts (ICA) on The Mall in London as part of the first ever iTunes Festival. On 21 August 2007, a 6-track digital EP iTunes Festival: London became available only on iTunes. All tracks written by Paul McCartney except where noted.

BBC Electric Proms

On 25 October 2007 Paul and his band played the Roundhouse in London as part of the BBC Electric Proms 2007. The band was joined by a string section for "Only Mama Knows," "Calico Skies" and "Eleanor Rigby." More than seven years later, on 3 December 2014, 17 of the 24 songs from the concert were released on iTunes, but soon after removed inexplicably in February 2015.

The seven songs not released from this performance are "C Moon", "The Long and Winding Road", "I'll Follow the Sun", "That Was Me", "Here Today", "House of Wax" and "I've Got a Feeling."

References
 Footnotes

 Citations

External links

[ Memory Almost Full] discography page at Billboard.com''

2007 albums
Paul McCartney albums
Albums produced by David Kahne
Hear Music albums
Albums recorded at RAK Studios
Albums recorded at A&M Studios
Albums recorded at AIR Studios